Susan H. Rodger is an American computer scientist known for work in computer science education including developing the software JFLAP for over twenty years. JFLAP is educational software for visualizing and interacting with formal languages and automata. Rodger is also known for peer-led team learning in computer science and integrating  computing into middle schools and high schools with Alice. She is also currently serving on the board of CRA-W and was chair of ACM SIGCSE from 2013 to 2016.

Biography
Rodger was born in Columbia, South Carolina. She received a B.S. in computer science and a B.S. in mathematics from North Carolina State University in 1983. She received a M.S. in computer science from Purdue University in 1985 and a Ph.D. in computer science from  Purdue University in 1989.

She immediately joined the Department of Computer Science at Rensselaer Polytechnic Institute as an assistant professor. In 1994 she moved to Duke University as an assistant professor of the Practice of Computer Science. She was promoted to associate professor of the practice of computer science in 1997 and to professor of the practice in 2008.

Awards
2006: Rodger was named an ACM Distinguished Member.
2007: Finalist in the NEEDS Premier Award for Excellence in Engineering Education Courseware (for the software JFLAP).
2014: ACM Karl V. Karlstrom Outstanding Educator Award.
2019: IEEE Computer Society Taylor L. Booth Education Award.
2019: David and Janet Vaughan Brooks Award

See also
 Owen Astrachan
 Duke University

References

External links
 Duke University: Susan H. Rodger, Department of Computer Science 
 Duke University: Susan H. Rodger, Department of Computer Science
 Susan H. Rodger, Writing Wikipedia Pages for Notable Women in Computing

American women computer scientists
Duke University faculty
Living people
American computer scientists
People from Columbia, South Carolina
North Carolina State University alumni
Purdue University alumni
Year of birth missing (living people)
Computer science educators
American women academics
21st-century American women